Keith J. Bulluck (born April 4, 1977) is a former football linebacker who played for eleven seasons in the National Football League (NFL). After playing college football for Syracuse University, he was drafted by the Tennessee Titans in the first round in the 2000 NFL Draft. He had a ten-year career with the Titans, which included a Pro Bowl selection in 2003. He played for the New York Giants in 2010.

Early years
At Clarkstown High School North in New City, New York, Bulluck was named first-team All County, first-team All-State, Blue-Chip All-American, and both Prep Football Report and Super Prep All-Northeast. Like many children in the New York metropolitan area in the 1980s and early 1990s, he idolized Giants linebacker Lawrence Taylor while growing up. He was also an All-County in basketball as a junior. On April 27, 2009, Bulluck's high school jersey, #1, was retired in a ceremony held at the high school. He also has a name plaque at Clarkstown High School North hung up on the "Hall of Fame".

College career
Bulluck attended Syracuse University, where he played for the Syracuse Orange football team from 1996 to 1999. He played strong safety, outside linebacker and middle linebacker. As a senior in 1999 he led the Big East in tackles with 138 and received the Bill Horr Award, which is given to Syracuse’s most valuable player. He finished his career with 375 tackles, six quarterback sacks, three interceptions, three forced fumbles and six fumble recoveries.

Professional career

Tennessee Titans
The Tennessee Titans selected Bulluck in the first round (30th overall) of the 2000 NFL Draft. Bulluck was the fifth linebacker drafted in 2000 and was one of four Pro Bowl linebackers selected in the first round of the 2000 NFL Draft. The first round also included Pro Bowl linebackers LaVar Arrington (2nd overall), Brian Urlacher (9th overall), and Julian Peterson (16th overall).

On July 1, 2000, the Tennessee Titans signed Bulluck to a four-year, $5.56 million contract that includes a signing bonus of $1.92 million.

After spending his first two seasons as a backup and special teamer, he became a starter in 2002. After becoming a starter he made a Pro Bowl in 2003 and has led the Titans in tackles five times. In 2004, he led the NFL in tackles with 152. In 2007, he recorded a Titans-record five interceptions for a linebacker.

New York Giants
On July 24, 2010, after a private workout with the team, he signed a one-year, $2.5 million contract with the Giants. He became an unrestricted free agent following the season.

Retirement
Bulluck did not play in the 2011 season after no teams signed him. After having the year off, he announced his retirement on January 25, 2012. On August 3, 2012, Bulluck formally retired from the National Football League with the team who drafted him, the Tennessee Titans. He became the first player in Titans franchise history to formally retire from their organization.

Bulluck joined the Titans broadcast team in Summer 2013. On August 25, 2013, Bulluck was arrested in Nashville, Tennessee for allegedly robbing a taxi driver, although the claims by the taxi driver are disputed. On September 13, 2013, charges were dropped.

NFL career statistics

Curling 
Since retirement from professional football, Keith has picked up the sport of curling. In March 2018 Jared Allen formed a team of all retired NFL players, consisting of Bulluck, Marc Bulger and Michael Roos with the goal of representing the United States at the 2022 Winter Olympics. They have since played together in the 2019 USA Men's Challenge Round (qualification event for the United States Men's Curling Championship) and Ed Werenich Golden Wrench Classic (a World Curling Tour event), going winless in both events.

The Outside Game 
In 2019 Bulluck partnered with the founders of the then 10-year-old conference series and sports media outlet "Blogs With Balls" to rebrand and relaunch under the umbrella "The Outside Game." Bulluck said in an announcement "The Outside Game was built to provide avenues that amplify conversation among athletes, creators, media, business, and marketers in an unfiltered and unbiased manner, just as BWB has for the past decade. The Outside Game gives athletes and contributors a real opportunity to address issues not exclusive to sport, and with a genuine voice and point of view rather than through the lens of corporate PR avenues." The first event under the rebrand was held September 5, 2019 at SubCulture in New York City and featured conversations with athletes PacMan Jones, Robin Lehner, Joanna Lohman, Alex Cavallini, and Jonathan Casillas, and media figures such as Greg Mescall, Erin Ashley Simon, Jeff Eisenband, Bleacher Report's Ben Osborne, and more.

In addition to the events, Bulluck co-hosts The Outside Game Podcast which is a mix of conversation and interviews with individuals from across sports and culture.

Just Love Cafe
In 2020, Bulluck opened Just Love Coffee Cafe in Franklin,TN. He aims to help under-privilaged and poor youth. He has partnered with the Big Brothers Big Sister of Middle Tennessee non-profit organization on multiple occasions, mentoring youth in the art of responsibility, life choices, and of course sports.

References

External links
 Official website
 Tennessee Titans bio
 New York Giants bio
 

1977 births
Living people
People from Suffern, New York
American football safeties
American football linebackers
Syracuse Orange football players
Tennessee Titans players
New York Giants players
American Conference Pro Bowl players
Sportspeople from the New York metropolitan area
Ed Block Courage Award recipients